Wilhelm Mohr (27 June 1917 – 26 September 2016) was a Norwegian aviation officer.

He was born in Fana to landowner Wilhelm Mohr and Emily Holm, and was a grandson of grain merchant Conrad Mohr. He served as aviation officer during the Second World War, both in the Norwegian Campaign and later in Little Norway in Canada, and with the No. 332 Squadron RAF. He was promoted Major General in 1962, and Lieutenant General in 1964, and served as head of the Royal Norwegian Air Force. He was decorated Commander of the Order of St. Olav in 1964. His war decorations include the War Cross with sword, the British Distinguished Flying Cross, and the American Legion of Merit.

He died on 26 September 2016, 99 years old.

References

External links

1917 births
2016 deaths
Norwegian Army Air Service personnel of World War II
Royal Norwegian Air Force personnel of World War II
Norwegian World War II pilots
Norwegian Royal Air Force pilots of World War II
Royal Norwegian Air Force generals
Recipients of the Distinguished Flying Cross (United Kingdom)
Foreign recipients of the Legion of Merit
Recipients of the War Cross with Sword (Norway)
Norwegian Military Academy alumni
Military personnel from Bergen